The Grimsel Tunnel is a proposed  tunnel for power transmission and rail transport in Switzerland.  , it was planned to run under the Grimsel Pass and link the Zentralbahn at the north end with the Matterhorn Gotthard Bahn at the south, and its construction is scheduled to begin in 2027.

The tunnel is proposed to carry a single-track metre gauge railway and railway electrification system. The total length of the new Grimsel Line route containing the tunnel would be .
The power transmission cables would run at 380kV and replace Swissgrid's existing overhead power line, and allow the removal of the 121 electricity pylons that had been in place for sixty years.

The intended railway route would continue from the Brünig railway line at Meiringen railway station, via the Meiringen–Innertkirchen railway, to a stop at Innertkirchen, then via new stations at Guttannen and Handegg to Oberwald railway station for continuation via the Furka Base Tunnel.  Travel time between Meiringen and Oberwald would be approximately 38 minutes—a reduction of three hours.

A company called  was founded by the promoters, with Peter Teuscher as its chair person.

In 2016, the estimated cost was 580-million Swiss Francs. The split cost of 290-million Swiss Francs each for railway and power transmission usage would less than the individual estimated costs of 490-million Swiss Francs for a power-only tunnel or 430-million Swiss Francs for a rail-only tunnel.
The tunnel route had first been proposed in 1860.

Route

References

External links

  (in German)
  (in German)

Proposed tunnels in Switzerland
Electric power transmission systems in Europe
Railway tunnels in Switzerland
Proposed energy infrastructure in Switzerland 
Proposed transport infrastructure in Switzerland